WWHM (1290 AM) is a radio station licensed to serve Sumter, South Carolina.  The station is owned by Community Broadcasters, LLC.  It airs an urban oldies format.

The station was assigned the WWHM call letters by the Federal Communications Commission on November 21, 2007.

References

External links

WHM
Urban oldies radio stations in the United States